This is a recap of the 1976 season for the Professional Bowlers Association (PBA) Tour.  It was the tour's 18th season, and consisted of 35 events. Earl Anthony added another "first" to his résumé, becoming the first player to win three PBA Player of the Year awards.  Anthony again dominated the tour with six victories and topped the $100,000 season earnings mark for the second straight year (topping his previous record by cashing $110,808).

Anthony, however, did not win a major title in 1976.  Those titles went to Paul Moser (BPAA U.S. Open), Marshall Holman (Firestone Tournament of Champions) and Paul Colwell (Brunswick PBA National Championship). Holman (21) became the youngest Tournament of Champions winner ever with his victory, a distinction he would hold until 2016 when Swede Jesper Svensson won the ToC at age 20.

The lead for career PBA titles changed hands a few times during the season. Dick Weber collected his 25th career title in February to hold the lead until July, when Don Johnson also won his 25th. By the end of the season, Earl Anthony had reached 26 titles to pass both. (Weber, however, had also won four BPAA All-Star events earlier in his career.  These were not counted as PBA titles at the time, but were added as titles in 2008 when the PBA amended its rules.)

Tournament schedule

References

External links
 1976 Season Schedule

Professional Bowlers Association seasons
1976 in bowling